The Eisner Award for Best Publication for Kids is an award for "creative achievement" in American comic books.

History and name change

The award was launched in 2008 as Best Publication for Kids. In 2012 the name was changed to Best Publication for Kids (ages 8–12). In 2016 the name was changed to Best Publication for Kids (ages 9–12). In 2020 the name was changed back to Best Publication for Kids.

Winners and nominees

Notes

References

Category
2008 establishments in the United States
Annual events in the United States
Awards established in 2008
Publication for Kids
Webcomic awards